Sundance Square is the name of a 35-block commercial, residential, entertainment and retail district in downtown Fort Worth, Texas. Named after the Sundance Kid in western folklore, it is a popular place for nightlife and entertainment in Fort Worth and for tourists visiting the Dallas/Fort Worth Metroplex.  It is owned by Fine Line investments, a division of billionaire Ed Bass's investment funds. 

The area includes numerous hotels, restaurants, condos, lofts, shops, museums, bars, clubs, a movie theatre, performing arts, concerts and festivals throughout the year. The former downtown Woolworth's Building, as well as Burk Burnett Building, are listed on the National Register of Historic Places. A mural on one building commemorates the Fort Worth segment of the Chisholm Trail cattle drives of 1867-1875. The district is also the location of the Bass Performance Hall.

See also
 List of Neighborhoods in Fort Worth, Texas
 Caravan of Dreams
 Reata Restaurant

References

External links

 Sundance Square
 Reata Restaurant
 Sid Richardson Museum

Neighborhoods in Fort Worth, Texas
History of Fort Worth, Texas
Economy of Fort Worth, Texas
Entertainment districts in Texas